Crognaleto is a comune and city of slightly less than 2,000 people in the Province of Teramo, central Italy. The commune of Crognaleto sits on the slopes of the Monti della Laga mountain range and extends across both the northern and the southern slopes of the Vomano Valley. It lies within the  Gran Sasso e Monti della Laga National Park.

History 
There is evidence of pre-Roman  settlements in the area in and around Castagneto although the location was likely only very sparsely populated until the Middle Ages.  Historically Crognaleto fell under the jurisdiction of the commune of Roseto.  The town was first given communal status in 1813, during the Napoleonic occupation of southern Italy.  A number of previously-autonomous surrounding villages and hamlets were designated  (outlying areas) of the Commune of Crognaleto.

Crognaleto
The communal capital of Crognaleto is well known in Abruzzo.   Interesting sites and features include:
Chiesa di Santa Caterina - a 16th-century church dedicated to Saint Catherine.
Chiesa della Madonna della Tibia  - a church constructed with the funds donated by Bernardo Paolini from nearby Amatrice.  Bernardo had lost his way in the woods near Crognaleto and fell into a large crevice.  His life had been a great risk but he escaped with only an injury to the tibia bone in his leg, hence the appellation given to this beloved church.  In 1617, the church was reconstructed at a location very near the pre-existing structure.  A house to shelter visiting pilgrims once stood next to the church but is now in ruins.

Villages (Frazioni)

Aiello
It is home to the church of Santi Silvestro e Rocco, a century church expanded in the 17th century.

Alvi

Sights include the church of Santa Maria Apparens, dating to the 16th century

Cervaro
It is home to the church of Saint Andrew, originally constructed in the 14th century having undergone several expansions and reconstructions since then.  Best noted for its 18th-century hand painted ceiling. Other sights include the  Palazzo Forcina-Nardi di Cervaro, a 16th-century palace, and the remains of ancient mills along a stream called the Zincano.

Cesacacastina
The town sits at an elevation of 1150 meters and sports a view of the nearby peaks of the Gran Sasso.  Many houses were constructed relatively recently in the 19th century.  Nearby, in the areas of Colle and Combrello are more ancient 16th-century dwellings.  The houses in all three areas are constructed of local stone.  Those in Colle are especially interesting in that the portals over many of the doors carry religious inscriptions and verses, often accompanied by Jesuit monograms.   The local church, dedicated to saints Peter and Paul, has a sign of the cross floor plan and features painted and gilded wooden altars in  Baroque style.

Figliola
The village takes its name from the Italian word ‘Filiola’ meaning a small stream of water. At one time, the village was part of the feudal holdings of the Dukes of Atri.

Frattoli
Records from the Commune of Amatrice show a peoples living in this location in the year 1297. It later was part of the Duchy of Atri and a feudal holding of the Acquaviva family. Frattoli is known for its artisan sculptures in both wooden and stone. Sights include:
Church of Saint John the Baptist, designed in Gothic style and containing a 17th-century portico.
Church of the Madonna of Assistance, now in ruins.
Church of Saint Anthony (restored in the 19th century).

Macchia Vomano
It is home to the church of St. Sylvester (16th century)

Nerito

The village is known for two annual festivals. One is the Fuoco di Natale (Christmas Bonfire) taking place from Christmas Eve to the morning of January 6 (the Epiphany celebration). The second is called Erede and takes place  the last Thursday before Lent. During the celebration feasts are held and newly-born first male children of families are honored.

Piano Vomano
The center of Piano Vomano likely owes its shape to the abandonment in the 16th century of nearby villages in Campanea and Colle del Vento, themselves sites of pre-existing Roman outposts. 
Sights include the church of Saint Nicholas likely, dating back to the 14th century and rebuilt in 1774, and the "Quercia Mazzucche" - a huge oak tree 8 meters in circumference.

Poggio Umbricchio

It borders the frazioni of Santa Croce e Altavilla. Ancient Roman ruins have been found nearby. In times past Poggio Umbricchio was part of the Acquaviva and other family's feudal holdings. It was an independent commune in the Napoleonic period.

As happened to a good number of nearby mountain villages, Poggio Umbricchio lost a good portion of its population in the difficult economic period following World War II.  In recent years the village appears virtually deserted, especially during the cold winter months.  These factors, along with the somewhat strange-sounding name of the village, have led some people in the larger cities of Teramo and Pescara to the conclusion that Poggio Umbricchio has a somewhat magical quality and exists more in fantasy than in reality.  In more recent years researched at the University of Teramo have studied more closely the history of this village and have initiated an oral history project amongst the dwindling numbers of village elders.

Sights include the church of  Saint Mary Laurentana, with a doorway dating back to 1570.

San Giorgio
Sights include the church Saint George and the Rocca Roseto, an ancient fortress now in ruins.

Senarica

Senarica can be found at an elevation of  along the SS 80 (state highway 80). It stands on a high peak overlooking the source of the Vomano River. Several houses in the village contain grey sandstone portals with inscriptions indicating the owners were exempt from certain taxes and duties. Although the claim had not been verified, this would suggest that the village, in common with other nearby locations, paid allegiance to the Republic of Venice, in opposition to Teramo, Penne and L'Aquila.

Tottea
Tottea is known for the sandstone rock formation on which it was originally constructed.  The village is the home of many stonemasons skilled in using this local material to construct decorative sculptures and architecturally important masterpieces.  Specialties include fireplace mantels and other ornamental door frames.  Displays featuring prototypes and documents related to these works are housed in the local village administrative offices.  Stonemasonry classes and local competitive expositions are from time to time.  These works by the local artisans have left a valuable and ever-growing patrimony attesting to the skilled workmanship of the many skilled stonemasons who have called Tottea their home.  In the area surrounding Tottea can be found several workshops specializing in the manufacture, restoration, and repair of small works of art made from stone.  Tottea and its skilled craftsmen are known throughout the world for these exquisite works of art.    The Chapel of Saint Anthony houses   a statue dated 1552.

Traditional lay and religious feasts and festivals
Fuoco di Natale  - held in Nerito.   of wood are lit ablaze on the 24th of December and allowed to burn through the Epiphany morning (6 January).
Fiera della Pastorizia - pastoral fair held in the beginning of the summer in San Giorgio.

Gastronomy

Ventricina is a type of mildly spicy sausage made the area in and around Crognaleto.  Ground pork is mixed with prosciutto crudo and other spices which typically include salt and pepper, bell peppers, peperoncini (dried hot peppers), garlic and rosemary. Fennel seeds and orange rind are sometimes added to this mixture which is then encased in the pig’s intestines or stomach before aging.  Ventricina is often spread on bread and is sometimes placed on the grill or in the oven to make a form of bruschetta.

References

External links
Cervaro website 
Information and events in Cesacastina 
Frattoli Website 
Poggio Umbricchio Website

Sources
Giulio Di Nicola, Crognaleto, in La Gazzetta di Teramo, 7 settembre 1975, p. 1.  
 Tottea, visioni d'epoca, Pro Loco di Tottea, Ricerche & Redazioni, Teramo, 2006.  

Cities and towns in Abruzzo